Ajanta may refer to:
Ajantha, Maharashtra, or Ajanta, a village in Aurangabad district, Maharashtra
Ajanta Caves
Ajanta Express
Ajanta Group
Ajanta, pen name of poet Penumarti Viswanatha Sastry

See also
Ajantha (disambiguation)